Günther Bredehorn (born 11 December 1935) was a German politician of the Free Democratic Party (FDP) and former member of the German Bundestag.

Life 
Bredehorn has been a member of the FDP since 1977. From 1980 to 1986, he was chairman of the FDP District Parliamentary Group in the district of Friesland, and from 1991 to 1996 he was deputy district administrator of the district. He was a member of the German Bundestag from 1980 to 1998, where he was the spokesman on agricultural policy for the FDP parliamentary group.

Literature

References

Members of the Bundestag for Lower Saxony
Members of the Bundestag 1994–1998
Members of the Bundestag 1990–1994
Members of the Bundestag 1987–1990
Members of the Bundestag 1983–1987
Members of the Bundestag 1980–1983
Members of the Bundestag for the Free Democratic Party (Germany)
Living people
1935 births